Xenurolebias is a genus of fish in the family Rivulidae. These annual killifish are endemic to temporary pools in the Atlantic forest near the coast in southeast Bahia and Espírito Santo, Brazil.

As typical of killifish, males are more colorful than females.

Species
Xenurolebias was formerly regarded as a subgenus of Simpsonichthys.

There are currently 4 recognized species in Xenurolebias:

 Xenurolebias cricarensis W. J. E. M. Costa, 2014
 Xenurolebias izecksohni da Cruz, 1983
 Xenurolebias myersi A. L. de Carvalho, 1971
 Xenurolebias pataxo W. J. E. M. Costa, 2014

References

Rivulidae
Freshwater fish genera